Hazel Joan Bryant (September 8, 1939 – November 7, 1983) was an American actress, opera singer, director, and playwright. She founded the Richard Allen Center for Culture and Art in 1969 and served as the executive director until 1983. Bryant died from a heart attack at her home in Manhattan at the age of 44, shortly after speaking at the United Nations.

Education and training
Bryant studied and performed music at the Peabody Preparatory School of Music, the Oberlin Conservatory of Music, and the Mozarteum Orchestra Salzburg. Bryant received a degree in theater administration from the Columbia University School of the Arts.

References 

1939 births
1983 deaths
African-American actresses
20th-century African-American women singers
20th-century American women opera singers
African-American women opera singers
American stage actresses
American theatre directors
Women theatre directors
American theatre managers and producers
Columbia University School of the Arts alumni
Oberlin Conservatory of Music alumni
People from Zanesville, Ohio
20th-century American actresses
20th-century American businesspeople
20th-century American businesswomen
Singers from Ohio
Classical musicians from Ohio